The Tray  Mountain Wilderness was designated in 1986 and currently consists of . The Wilderness is located within the borders of the Chattahoochee National Forest in Habersham, Rabun, Towns and White counties, Georgia and is managed in the Chattooga Ranger District.  The Wilderness is managed by the United States Forest Service and is part of the National Wilderness Preservation System.

The highest elevation in the Tray  Mountain Wilderness is the  peak of Tray  Mountain and the wilderness includes part of the Soque River.  The Appalachian Trail passes through the Wilderness for 16.5 unusually level miles, following a ridge.   The Tray Mountain Wilderness is located near the Mark Trail Wilderness, which is located across State Route 75 to the west.

External links 
Wilderness.net entry for the Tray  Mountain Wilderness
Sherpa Guide for Tray Mountain Wilderness

Wilderness areas of Georgia (U.S. state)
Wilderness areas of the Appalachians
Protected areas of Habersham County, Georgia
Protected areas of Rabun County, Georgia
Protected areas of Towns County, Georgia
Protected areas of White County, Georgia
Protected areas established in 1986
Chattahoochee-Oconee National Forest
1986 establishments in Georgia (U.S. state)